Ernest "Pete" Glynde Mangum (January 17, 1931 - March 17, 2000) was an American football linebacker who played two seasons, for the New York Giants and Denver Broncos. After completing his military service, he played for the Winnipeg Blue Bombers from 1957 to 1958 after New York traded his rights for quarterback Chuck Curtis. He played 2 games in 1954 and 14 in 1960.

References

1931 births
2000 deaths
Players of American football from Louisiana
American football linebackers
New York Giants players
Winnipeg Blue Bombers players
Denver Broncos players
People from West Carroll Parish, Louisiana
Ole Miss Rebels football players